Hala El Badry (born 1954 in Cairo), a graduate of Cairo University, is an Egyptian journalist and novelist. She is deputy editor of an Egyptian radio and television magazine.

Muntaha, a novel published in 1995, is set in the fictional village of Muntaha in the Nile Delta. Imra'atun ma (A Certain Woman), Hala El Badry's fourth book, was named best novel of 2001 at the Cairo International Book Fair.

Works 
 Muntaha. 1995
 Muntaha. Translated by Nancy Roberts. Cairo: American University in Cairo Press, 2006.  Selected pages
 Imra'atun ma. 2001
 A Certain Woman. Translated by Farouk Abdel Wahab. Cairo: American University in Cairo Press, 2003. ; London: Arabia Books, 2008.  Selected pages

Notes 

1954 births
Egyptian novelists
Egyptian journalists
Egyptian women writers
Living people
Cairo University alumni
Egyptian women novelists